Gavin Kirk McCallum (born August 24, 1987) is a Canadian professional soccer player who plays as a left back for Bognor Regis Town.

Club career
Born in Mississauga, Ontario, McCallum began his career in 2005 with Yeovil Town. He agreed an 18-month contract with the club on 31 January 2006. On August 22, 2006, he joined Tamworth on a month's loan, joining the club for a second month on October 5, 2006. On November 23, 2006, he joined Crawley Town on loan. On March 2, 2007, he joined Dorchester Town on a month's loan. The following day he made his debut for the club in the 5–1 Conference South home defeat to Lewes before netting his first goals for the club when scoring twice in the 3–2 victory at Thurrock a week later. He remained with the club until the end of the season, scoring a total of five goals in 15 Conference South appearances.

He later played for Weymouth and Havant & Waterlooville.

He joined Sutton United ahead of the 2008–09 season, scoring just twelve minutes into his debut in the 1–1 Isthmian League draw at Harlow Town on August 16, 2008. He went on to play a total of 54 times for the club, scoring 19 goals (41 league appearances seeing him yield 14 goals). McCallum signed for League Two side Hereford United on a short-term deal on August 21, 2009, having impressed while on trial with the club.

In the summer of 2010, McCallum joined Lincoln City on a two-year deal. As he was under 24 a fee had to be agreed between The Imps and Hereford, and this fee was agreed on July 26, 2010. He made his debut for Lincoln City in a 2–0 loss to Torquay United August 14, 2010. McCallum scored his first goal for Lincoln on January 15, 2011, in a 2–1 home loss to Wycombe Wanderers. About three weeks later Gavin scored his second league goal of the season as well as the winning goal in a tight match versus Bradford City on February 1, 2011. The game ended in a 2–1 away win at the Valley Parade, with McCallum paying tribute to his father after scoring the winning goal in the 79th minute. He then went on to score in a 2–1 away loss to Port Vale.

In May 2011, he was made available for transfer by the club after a mass clear out of players following relegation from the Football League.

On November 22, 2011, McCallum signed on loan for League Two club Barnet until 8 January 2012. On January 30, 2012 he left Lincoln City by mutual consent.

He joined Woking ahead of the 2012–13 season.
He was released at the end of the 2012–13 season after failing to hold down a regular starting spot in the first team.

McCallum returned to Woking for pre-season training, with manager Garry Hill commenting "We told him ‘you’re not fit enough, you have talent but for that to come out you will have to go away, come back pre-season and show what you can do.’" Having impressed Hill, he agreed a further one year contract with The Cards However, in October, he was transfer listed along with Lee Sawyer with manager Garry Hill stating that the duo did not feature in his future plans after being disappointed with their attitude. On Monday 9 December 2013, Woking announced that he'd been released from his contract in order to join former club Sutton United, McCallum having made his second debut for The Us the previous Saturday in the 3-2 Football Conference South home victory over Maidenhead United. In need of regular matches to improve his fitness, McCallum joined Tonbridge Angels on an initial one-month loan debuting in the club's 3-1 Football Conference South defeat at Dover Athletic on 26 December 2013. Although the club were keen to extend the loan, he was recalled to Sutton United. In June 2014 he joined Eastbourne Borough.

It was announced on June 23, 2018, that he had signed for Welling United.

On October 2, 2020, McCullum joined Dartford.

On June 3, 2021, McCullem joined Bognor Regis Town.

International career
After representing the Canada U-20 men's national soccer team, Gavin McCallum earned his first cap with the Canada senior team in a friendly against Venezuela on May 29, 2010, with the distinction of scoring on his debut in the 92nd minute to earn Canada a 1-1 draw.

On February 27, 2019, it was announced that McCallum had been selected to the Cascadia official soccer team for their match against the Chagos Islands.

International goals
Scores and results list Canada's goal tally first.

Career statistics

Personal life
Gavin is the nephew of Canadian former international Trevor McCallum.

References

External links

 
 
 

1987 births
Living people
Soccer players from Mississauga
Black Canadian soccer players
Canadian soccer players
Canada men's youth international soccer players
Canada men's international soccer players
Association football wingers
Yeovil Town F.C. players
Tamworth F.C. players
Crawley Town F.C. players
Dorchester Town F.C. players
Weymouth F.C. players
Havant & Waterlooville F.C. players
Sutton United F.C. players
Hereford United F.C. players
Lincoln City F.C. players
Barnet F.C. players
Woking F.C. players
Tonbridge Angels F.C. players
Eastbourne Borough F.C. players
Dartford F.C. players
Bognor Regis Town F.C. players
English Football League players
National League (English football) players
Canadian expatriate soccer players
Expatriate footballers in England
Canadian expatriate sportspeople in England